The nation of Lesotho has a single railway station, located in the capital city Maseru. It is the terminus of the Maseru branch line, which connects to the railway network of South Africa.

Overview

It opened on 18 December 1905.

As of 2008, there have been talks of building new railways to connect Lesotho to Durban and Port Elizabeth.

See also
 History of rail transport in Lesotho
 Transport in Lesotho
 Rail transport in South Africa

References

External links